Edder Fabián Fuertes Bravo (born 27 March 1992) is an Ecuadorian footballer who plays for El Nacional as a left back.

Club career
Fuertes finished his formation at El Nacional, making his professional debut on 26 October 2011, against Manta.

In January 2012, Fuertes signed with Deportivo Cuenca, in a swap deal for Juan José Govea.

References

External links
Edder Fuertes profile at Federación Ecuatoriana de Fútbol 

1992 births
Living people
Ecuadorian footballers
Association football defenders
Ecuadorian Serie A players
C.D. El Nacional footballers
C.D. Cuenca footballers
S.D. Quito footballers
S.D. Aucas footballers
Footballers at the 2011 Pan American Games
Pan American Games competitors for Ecuador
21st-century Ecuadorian people